The Musée Pasteur is a museum dedicated to French scientist Louis Pasteur. It is located within the Institut Pasteur at 25 Rue du Docteur Roux, Paris, France, in the 15th arrondissement, and is open daily in the warmer months; an admission fee is charged.

The museum was established in 1935, in honor of Louis Pasteur, and preserves his memory in the apartment where he spent the last seven years of his life, it also has an impressive room where some 1,000 scientific instruments are exhibited. The museum houses the Neo-Byzantine chapel in which he is buried.

See also 
 List of museums in Paris
 List of things named after Louis Pasteur

References 
 Musée Pasteur
 Pariserve description (French)
 Stephen Fallon, Paris, Lonely Planet, 2004, page 109. .

Musee pasteur
Museums in Paris
Buildings and structures in the 15th arrondissement of Paris
Tourist attractions in Paris
Pasteur
Science museums in France
History of science museums